Pivnice may refer to the following places:

Pivnice (Bačka Palanka)
Pivnice (Cazin)